Gertrude of Babenberg (– 8 April 1150), a member of the House of Babenberg, was Duchess consort of Bohemia from 1140 until her death, by her marriage to the Přemyslid duke Vladislaus II.

Life
She was the daughter of Margrave Leopold III of Austria (died 1136) and his second wife, the Salian heiress Agnes of Waiblingen. Upon the death of her father, Gertrude's brother Leopold IV succeeded as Austrian margrave and in 1138 married the Přemyslid princess Maria of Bohemia, a cousin of her future husband.

Gertrude married Vladislaus II, eldest son of the late Duke Vladislaus I of Bohemia in 1140. Her husband had left the Duchy of Bohemia during the rule of his uncle, Duke Soběslav I, but was recalled by the local nobility after Soběslav's death. Through her mother, Gertrude was a half-sister of the Hohenstaufen king Conrad III of Germany, thus a good catch for Vladislaus. At the time of the siege of Prague by his cousin Count Conrad II of Znojmo in 1142, she successfully defended Prague Castle with the help of her brother-in-law Děpold, while Vladislaus sought assistance from King Conrad III.

Gertrude participated in projects of her husband Vladislaus to found new religious institutions and due to her encouragement, the duke invited foreign religious orders to establish themselves in Bohemia. She gave birth to four children and died in 1150 at the age of 30 at her residence in Prague.

Issue
Frederick, Duke of Bohemia (Bedřich; d. 1189)
 a daughter (Richeza?), married Yaroslav II of Kyiv
Svatopluk, married Odola, a daughter of King Géza II of Hungary
Adalbert III of Bohemia (Vojtĕch; 1145–1200), Archbishop of Salzburg
Agnes (Anežka; d. 1228), abbess of St George of Prague

Literature 
 ŽEMLIČKA, J. Čechy v době knížecí 1034–1198. Praha: NLN, 2002. 660 p. .

1110s births
Year of birth uncertain
1150 deaths
Duchesses of Bohemia
12th-century Bohemian people
Babenberg
German Bohemian people
People from Melk
Women in medieval European warfare
Women in 12th-century warfare
12th-century Bohemian women
Daughters of monarchs